The 1991-92 Ronchetti Cup was the 21st edition of FIBA Europe's second-tier competition for women's basketball clubs, running from 2 October 1991 to 18 March 1992. A quarter-finals round as introduced, and the qualifying round was shortened. Alike the previous edition the final confronted two Italian teams, with five-times European Cup champion AS Vicenza defeating Libertas Trogylos in the final to become the fourth Italian team to win the competition.

Qualifying round

Round of 32

Group stage

Group A

Group B

Group C

Group D

Quarter-finals

Semifinals

Final

References

1991–92
1991–92 in European women's basketball